Anne-Marie Payet (born August 1, 1949) is a French politician. Between 2001 and 2011, she represented the island of Réunion as a member of the Senate of France.

References

Page on the Senate website

1949 births
Living people
Politicians of Réunion
Union for French Democracy politicians
Democratic Movement (France) politicians
French Senators of the Fifth Republic
Women from Réunion in politics
21st-century French women politicians
20th-century French women politicians
Women members of the Senate (France)
Senators of Réunion